Žuráň is a small hill (286 metres) near the village of Podolí in the Czech Republic.

The hill became famous because 2 December 1805 Napoleon Bonaparte led his famous battle of Austerlitz from its peak. Therefore, peak of Žuráň was proclaimed to be extraterritoriality of France. At the peak of the hill there is a small memorial of battle (with a map of battlefield) and also flags of all nations fighting in the battle.

Žuráň is also important as tumulus of ancient Germanic high aristocracy of Moravia (probably from 5th and 6th century - according to historian Josef Poulík king Wacho was buried there, but newer historians are not certain about identity of buried people) and a rich archaeological site.

Archaeological sites in the Czech Republic
Mountains and hills of the Czech Republic
Brno-Country District